Eloisia is a Brazilian singer and songwriter, born in Rio de Janeiro, Brazil.

Music career
In 2004, Eloisia began working with Marc Collin and his band Nouvelle Vague, which incorporates new wave and bossa nova music. She contributed vocals to the songs "Just Can't Get Enough" and "Love Will Tear Us Apart" on their first album which became a worldwide indie bestseller.

In 2015, The Telegraph named the album's cover of "Just Can't Get Enough" in a list of the "50 best covers".

Eloisia also sang on three albums by German songwriter Meeco, including a duet with Gregory Porter in "Gotas de adeus" ("Tears of Farewell").

Discography

Guest appearances

References

Brazilian women singer-songwriters
Living people
English-language singers from Brazil
Year of birth missing (living people)
21st-century Brazilian women singers
21st-century Brazilian singers